Houck is a census-designated place (CDP) in Apache County, Arizona, United States.  The population was 1,024 at the 2010 census.

History
Houck was founded by a mail carrier by that name working a route from Prescott to Fort Wingate. In 1877, he established a trading post called Houck's Tank here. Houck left in 1885.

Houck was home to Fort Courage (a replica of the set of the 1960s television series F Troop, which was a tourist attraction along Route 66) and a Greyhound bus stop. It once had a gas station, a Taco Bell, and a pancake house. It is home to the Native American Baha'i Institute.

Geography
Houck is located at  (35.283615, -109.237695).

Climate
According to the Köppen Climate Classification system, Houck has a semi-arid climate, abbreviated "BSk" on climate maps.

Demographics

As of the census of 2000, there were 1,087 people, 312 households, and 234 families residing in the CDP.  The population density was 25.7 people per square mile (9.9/km2).  There were 414 housing units at an average density of 9.8/sq mi (3.8/km2).  The racial makeup of the CDP was 95.6% Native American, 2.2% White, 0.1% Black or African American, 0.1% Asian, and 2.0% from two or more races.  1.0% of the population were Hispanic or Latino of any race.

There were 312 households, out of which 47.1% had children under the age of 18 living with them, 37.8% were married couples living together, 28.2% had a female householder with no husband present, and 25.0% were non-families. 22.4% of all households were made up of individuals, and 5.1% had someone living alone who was 65 years of age or older.  The average household size was 3.48 and the average family size was 4.19.

In the CDP, the age distribution of the population shows 42.2% under the age of 18, 7.3% from 18 to 24, 24.9% from 25 to 44, 19.1% from 45 to 64, and 6.4% who were 65 years of age or older.  The median age was 26 years. For every 100 females, there were 94.1 males.  For every 100 females age 18 and over, there were 92.6 males.

The median income for a household in the CDP was $12,353, and the median income for a family was $20,208. Males had a median income of $18,750 versus $22,788 for females. The per capita income for the CDP was $5,219.  About 53.8% of families and 53.5% of the population were below the poverty line, including 55.7% of those under age 18 and 51.4% of those age 65 or over.

Education
The area is served by Sanders Unified School District.

The area is served by Sanders Elementary School, Sanders Middle School, and Valley High School.

Gallery

See also

 List of census-designated places in Arizona

References

External links

Census-designated places in Apache County, Arizona
Populated places on the Navajo Nation
U.S. Route 66 in Arizona